Violin Concerto No. 2 may refer to any composer's second violin concerto:

Violin Concerto No. 2 (Bartók) in B minor
Violin Concerto No. 2 (Bruch) in D minor
Violin Concerto No. 2 (Glass), The American Four Seasons
Violin Concerto No. 2 (Haydn) in D major, by Joseph Haydn
Violin Concerto No. 2 (Joachim) in D minor
Violin Concerto No. 2 (Lindberg)
Violin Concerto No. 2 (Martinů) in G minor
Violin Concerto No. 2 (Mozart) in D major
Violin Concerto No. 2 (Paganini) in B minor
Violin Concerto No. 2 (Piston)
Violin Concerto No. 2 (Prokofiev) in G minor
Violin Concerto No. 2 (Saint-Saëns) in C major
Violin Concerto No. 2 (Shostakovich) in C-sharp minor
Violin Concerto No. 2 (Vieuxtemps) in F-sharp minor, Sauret by Henri Vieuxtemps
Violin Concerto No. 2 (Wieniawski) in D minor

See also 
Violin Concerto
List of compositions for violin and orchestra